In astronautics, a black hole starship is the theoretical concept of a starship capable of interstellar travel using a black hole as an energy source for spacecraft propulsion. The concept was first discussed in science fiction, notably in the book Imperial Earth by Arthur C. Clarke, and in the work of Charles Sheffield, in which energy extracted from a Kerr–Newman black hole is described as powering the rocket engines in the story "Killing Vector" (1978).

In a more detailed analysis, a proposal to create an artificial black hole and using a parabolic reflector to reflect its Hawking radiation was discussed in 2009 by Louis Crane and Shawn Westmoreland. Their conclusion was that it was on the edge of possibility, but that quantum gravity effects that are presently unknown will either make it easier, or make it impossible. Similar concepts were also sketched out by Bolonkin.

Advantages
Although beyond current technological capabilities, a black hole starship offers some advantages compared to other possible methods. For example, in nuclear fusion or fission, only a small proportion of the mass is converted into energy, so enormous quantities of material would be needed. Thus, a nuclear starship would greatly deplete Earth of fissile and fusile material. One possibility is antimatter, but the manufacturing of antimatter is hugely energy-inefficient, and antimatter is difficult to contain. The Crane and Westmoreland paper states:

Criteria
According to the authors, a black hole to be used in space travel needs to meet five criteria:

 has a long enough lifespan to be useful,
 is powerful enough to accelerate itself up to a reasonable fraction of the speed of light in a reasonable amount of time,
 is small enough that we can access the energy to make it,
 is large enough that we can focus the energy to make it,
 has mass comparable to a starship.

Black holes seem to have a sweet spot in terms of size, power and lifespan which is almost ideal. A black hole weighing 606,000 metric tons (6.06 × 108 kg) would have a Schwarzschild radius of 0.9 attometers (0.9 × 10–18 m, or 9 × 10–19 m), a power output of 160 petawatts (160 × 1015 W, or 1.6 × 1017 W), and a 3.5-year lifespan. With such a power output, the black hole could accelerate to 10% the speed of light in 20 days, assuming 100% conversion of energy into kinetic energy. Assuming only 10% conversion into kinetic energy, it would take 10 times more.

Getting the black hole to act as a power source and engine also requires a way to convert the Hawking radiation into energy and thrust. One potential method involves placing the hole at the focal point of a parabolic reflector attached to the ship, creating forward thrust, if such a reflector can be built. A slightly easier, but less efficient method would involve simply absorbing all the gamma radiation heading towards the fore of the ship to push it onwards, and let the rest shoot out the back. This would, however, generate an enormous amount of heat as radiation is absorbed by the dish.

Criticism 
It is not clear that a starship powered by Hawking radiation can be made feasible within the laws of known physics. In the standard black hole thermodynamic model, the average energy of emitted quanta increases as size decreases, and extremely small black holes emit the majority of their energy in particles other than photons. In the Journal of the British Interplanetary Society, Jeffrey S. Lee of Icarus Interstellar states a typical quantum of radiation from a one-attometer black hole would be too energetic to be reflected. Lee further argues absorption (for example, by pair production from emitted gamma rays) may also be infeasible: A titanium "Dyson cap", optimized at 1 cm thickness and a radius around 33 km (to avoid melting), would absorb almost half the incident energy, but the maximum spaceship velocity over the black hole lifetime would be less than 0.0001c (about 30 km/s), according to Lee's calculations.

Govind Menon of Troy University suggests exploring the use of a rotating (Kerr–Newmann) black hole instead: "With non-rotating black holes, this is a very difficult thing...we typically look for energy almost exclusively from rotating black holes. Schwarzschild black holes do not radiate in an astrophysical, gamma ray burst point of view. It is not clear if Hawking radiation alone can power starships."

In fiction 
 Arthur C. Clarke, Imperial Earth (1976) 
 Charles Sheffield, "Killing Vector" (1978)
 Peter Watts, "The Freeze Frame Revolution" (2016)
 In the 2014 Hannu Rajaniemi science fiction novel The Causal Angel Jean le Flambeur's ship Leblanc has a black hole that emits Hawking radiation which is used for propulsion.
 In the Star Trek universe, the Romulan D'deridex-class warbird uses an artificial quantum singularity as a power source for its warp propulsion drive.
 In the 1997 Paul W. S. Anderson science fiction horror film Event Horizon, the eponymous starship uses an artificial black hole drive to achieve faster-than-light travel.
 In the MMO Eve Online, starships designed by the Triglavian faction utilize naked singularities contained on the external hull as their vessel's primary power source.
 In Foundation (TV series), jump ships appear to use black holes to power their jumpdrives, enabling Faster-than-light (FTL) travel over interstellar distances. This differs from the Foundation series on which the TV series is based, where FTL travel is facilitated through hyperspace travel.
 In the TV series, Doctor Who, the TARDIS is powered by a black hole and that is not just how it is capable of being bigger on the inside but also how it travels through time.

See also 
 Abraham–Lorentz force
 Beyond black holes
 Black hole electron
 Hawking radiation
 Kugelblitz (astrophysics)
 List of quantum gravity researchers
 Micro black hole

References 

Hypothetical spacecraft
Interstellar travel